Lau Sui-fei is a table tennis player. She competed at the Beijing 2008 Summer Olympics and the Athens 2004 Summer Olympics. She started playing table tennis when she was eight.

See also
 Hong Kong, China at the 2008 Summer Paralympics

External links
 https://web.archive.org/web/20090603175518/http://results.beijing2008.cn/WRM/ENG/BIO/Athlete/9/237539.shtml
 https://web.archive.org/web/20120306021714/http://www.ittf.com/biography/biography_web_details.asp?Player_ID=105091

References

1981 births
Living people
Hong Kong female table tennis players
Olympic table tennis players of Hong Kong
Table tennis players from Jiangsu
Table tennis players at the 2004 Summer Olympics
Table tennis players at the 2008 Summer Olympics
Table tennis players at the 2006 Asian Games
Table tennis players at the 2002 Asian Games
People from Zhenjiang
Asian Games competitors for Hong Kong
21st-century Hong Kong women